Tinissa phrictodes is a moth of the family Tineidae. It was described by Edward Meyrick in 1910. It is found on the Solomon Islands.

References

Moths described in 1910
Scardiinae